Kanchana 2 (marketed as Muni 3: Kanchana 2) is a 2015 Indian Tamil-language horror comedy film written, produced and directed by Raghava Lawrence, who enacted dual roles in it. It is the third installment in the Muni (film series). The film stars Nithya Menen, Taapsee Pannu and Kovai Sarala and was released worldwide on 17 April 2015. The film was remade in Kannada as Kalpana 2 (2016) starring Upendra.

Plot
Raghava is a cameraman for the channel Green TV where his crush Nandini also works. When Green TV drops down to second position in the ratings, Nandini advises to shoot a horror program to bring their channel back to first position. After the board members agree on this plan, Nandini decides on a location with a house with an intense haunted look, without knowing the fact that it is actually haunted. She sets out with Raghava, his watchman Mayil, Dr. Prasad, and the show's anchor Pooja  to complete the task.

While shooting on a nearby beach, Nandini discovers a Thali and after the discovery, mysterious events start taking place and she decides to visit a priest. The priest discovers that the Thali is actually haunted, and lets Nandini out of his room, and returns the Thali to the spirit. Nandini does not seem to believe it, and the priest challenges her to check the place where she had taken it from. After Nandini and Pooja disturb the Thali for a second time, it does not leave them. She rushes to the priest, and helps her. As instructed by him, she prepares a coffin and a groomed woman's corpse which has the Thali. They move to a distance and shoot to see that the coffin literally breaks open and the dead woman is dragged by the ghost. 

All the members escape out of fear and Raghava collapses. The priest is also killed and Nandini becomes possessed by the ghost. Raghava and Nandini move into another house, where the haunted Nandini is planning something, and to their surprise, Raghava's mother, and Nandini's sister-in-law also come to stay there. Several changes occur in Nandini which only Raghava notices at first; she starts smoking at night and even thrashes him. Soon, the family realise that she is possessed. Nandini (now possessed as Ganga) influences Shiva's ghost, to be sent into Raghava. When Raghava's mother and Nandini's sister-in-law return, they are beaten up. They retreat to a church and learn about Shiva and Ganga.  
 
Past: Ganga is handicapped, but Shiva loves her. Unfortunately, Marudhu  killed and buried them when Ganga refused to marry his insane son Shankar. Marudhu also killed Shiva and Ganga's family and made Shiva's best friend insane. Before dying, Shiva killed Shankar. 

Present: When Raghava (possessed as Shiva) killed Marudhu's brother, Marudhu learns that a spirit killed him, and gets a tantrik to revive a dead Shankar to kill Shiva and Ganga. Shiva battles Shankar and eventually defeats him. Ganga takes her revenge by killing Marudhu. Shiva returns Raghava safely to his family and promises to return whenever they needed him. The story of Shiva and Ganga restores Green TV back to first position.

Cast

 Raghava Lawrence as Raghava and Shiva (dual role) 
 Nithya Menen as Ganga
 Taapsee Pannu as Nandini
 Kovai Sarala as Raghava's mother
 Renuka as Nandini's sister-in-law
 Jayaprakash as Marudhu
 Rajendran as Marudhu's henchman
 Suhasini Maniratnam as Green TV Head
 Sriman as Dr. Prasad
 Mayilsamy as Watchman
 Pooja Ramachandran as Pooja
 Manobala as Arnold
 Jangiri Madhumitha as Aishwarya
 Pandu as Dr. Pandurangan
 Chaams as Aravind Swamy
 Bhanu Chander as Chandru
 Vinu Chakravarthy as Raghava's father (photo only)
 Mathi as Church Father
 Boys Rajan
 Janani Balasubramaniam
 Ramar (special appearance in "Sillatta Pillatta")

Production
Raghava Lawrence began work on the third installment in the Muni franchise in 2012, then titled Muni 3: Ganga. He said that he had two different storylines for the sequel. Taapsee Pannu was selected as the female lead. Anjali was said to have been signed for the title role of Ganga, but she was later replaced by Nithya Menen.  Lawrence introduced his brother Elvin in the film, who danced in a music video. Lawrence was reported to be appearing in six different looks in the film. Pooja Ramachandran was also chosen and was said to be playing the role of an anchor. In October 2013, Lawrence injured himself while filming and the making of the film was stopped for over three months. The film was in production for over two years.

Soundtrack

The soundtrack features five songs composed by C. Sathya, S. Thaman, debutants Ashwamithra and Leon James, with the latter contributing two songs to the album.

Release
The film was released on 17 April 2015 in around 750 screens worldwide alongside Mani Ratnam's O Kadhal Kanmani. The Telugu version was released later on 1 May 2015 in around 550 screens.

Critical reception
Kanchana 2 opened to positive reviews from critics.

The Times of India gave 3 stars out of 5 and wrote, "The comedy is broad and low-brow, banking on gay humour and the reactions of the characters when they are spooked by the presence of the ghost. It becomes too childish at times but you laugh nevertheless...the film does what it promises — we chuckle, cower, cry and at times, cringe". Behindwoods gave the film 2.75 out of 5 stars and said, "Looks like Lawrence has mastered the genre, so well that he knows how to keep the audience at the edge of their seats. His creative imagination has made this film different from the usual horror comedy films". Rediff rated the film 2.5 on 5, calling it "an enjoyable film" and wrote, "The plot may be out of date and the comedy absurd, but the antics of the familiar characters and their enthusiasm make you laugh despite yourself". Sify wrote, "Kanchana 2 is no different from Lawrence's earlier horror comedies...The formula is the same – mix crass comedy with lots of horror, dead person's spirit getting into hero/heroine body, slapstick humour, glamour, melodrama, ladies sentiments, fight scenes...Add five songs, haunted house, scream and wailing sounds, it works".

Indo-Asian News Service gave 2.5 stars out of 5 and wrote, "The movie, which follows a very clichéd and dated format of horror template, suffers heavily due to the lack of a good story" and called it "undoubtedly a weak film in the franchise".

The Hindu wrote, "The acting isn’t the problem; the predictable story is...Kanchana-3, which is hinted at before the end credits, needs to do better if the franchise has to survive".

Box office
Kanchana 2 grossed approximately  worldwide.

On its first day, the film grossed  nett in Tamil Nadu alone and around  worldwide. The film had a "phenomenal" opening, earning  nett in Tamil Nadu in two days. Kanchana 2 earned  nett in Tamil Nadu in its opening weekend. In Chennai city alone, the film made  in three days.

The film grossed  in Tamil Nadu in ten days. It made  from TN, Kerala and Karnataka in fourteen days.

In UK and Ireland, the film made  in the opening weekend. In Malaysia, the film had a very good opening, grossing  in its first three days.

Sequel 
A sequel to the film, Kanchana 3 was released on 19, April 2019. While it was actually connected to Muni 2: Kanchana, due to Kanchana being a bigger hit and more interesting than Kanchana 2, and Kanchana 2 being a different story, it was not the sequel to the previous film and it had the cast from the previous film reprising their roles.

Legacy
The dialogue from this film "Motta Siva Ketta Siva" inspired a 2017 film of same name also starred Raghava Lawrence.

References

External links
 
 Kanchana 2 on Sun Pictures
 Muni 3 on Sri Thenadal Films

2015 films
Indian comedy horror films
2015 comedy horror films
Films scored by Thaman S
Films scored by C. Sathya
2010s Tamil-language films
Indian sequel films
Tamil films remade in other languages
Indian films about revenge
2015 comedy films
Films directed by Raghava Lawrence